Panagiotakis Fotilas (Greek: Παναγιωτάκης Φωτήλας; died 1824) was a Greek politician and a revolutionary leader.  He was the son of Asimakis.

Biography

Fotilas was born in Kalavryta.  On March 19, 1821, he attempted to kill the Turks in Sopoto.  He battled in the battle of Lalas and the Siege of Patras.

References
Peloponisii agonistes tou 1821, Nikitara apomnimonevmata (Πελοποννήσιοι αγωνιστές του 1821, Νικηταρά απομνημονεύματα = Peloponnesian Revolutionary Leaders in 1821, Nikitaras Remembered), Fotakos, Vergina publishers, Athens 1996
Fotakou apomnimonevmata (Φωτάκου απομνημονεύματα = Fotakou Remembered), Vergina, 1996
This article is translated and is based from the article at the Greek Wikipedia (el:Main Page)

Year of birth missing
1824 deaths
People from Kalavryta
Greek people of the Greek War of Independence